Shinobu Asagoe and Seiko Okamoto were the defending champions, but did not participate.

Yan Zi and Zheng Jie won the title.

Seeds

Draw

Results

References

2005 Moorilla Hobart International
Tennis in Tasmania
Sport in Hobart